Sir Henry Neville Lindley Keswick (born 29 September 1938) is a British businessman who is chairman emeritus of Jardine Matheson.

Early life
Keswick was born in 1938 in Shanghai, China, the son of Sir William Johnstone "Tony" Keswick. He is part of the Keswick family and the older brother of Simon Keswick and Sir Chips Keswick. He was educated at Eton College and Trinity College, Cambridge.

During the coronation of Elizabeth II in 1953, Keswick was a page to Field Marshal Alan Brooke, and took part in the ceremony in Westminster Abbey. During his period of national service from 1956 to 1958, he was commissioned into the Scots Guards.

Business career
Keswick owned The Spectator, a British conservative magazine, from 1975 to 1980. He is the chairman of Jardine Matheson Holdings Ltd, which he joined in 1961. He has been a director since 1967 and became managing director in 1970, and chairman in 1972.

Other interests
He is vice chairman of the Hong Kong Association and a member of the council of the National Trust. He was previously the chairman of the National Portrait Gallery.

Honours 
Keswick was knighted in the 2009 Birthday Honours for services to British business interests overseas and charitable activities in the UK.

Personal life

Keswick is a practising Roman Catholic and is a member of The Tablet.

In 1985, he married Tessa Keswick, a public policy analyst who went on to be chancellor of the University of Buckingham. She is the younger daughter of Simon Fraser, 15th Lord Lovat and was formerly married to Hugh Mackay, 14th Lord Reay. They live at Oare House, a large country estate in Oare, Wiltshire. He also owns an 18,000 acre shooting estate, Hunthill Estate, in the Angus Glens area of East Scotland; the shooting is mainly grouse.

Keswick and his wife donated £100,000 to the Conservative Party in the 2017 General Election. According to the Register of Members' Financial Interests, in January 2020, Keswick donated £2,000 to Conservative MP Jacob Rees-Mogg. He also donated £10,000 to MP Danny Kruger.

References

Living people
1938 births
People educated at Eton College
Alumni of Trinity College, Cambridge
British businesspeople
British Roman Catholics
Jardine Matheson Group
Knights Bachelor
Henry
Conservative Party (UK) donors
N M Rothschild & Sons people
Businesspeople from Shanghai